Milan Pribićević was a Yugoslav political activist who nominally led ORJUNA. He had three brothers, Svetozar Pribićević, Adam Pribićević and Valerijan Pribičević, all of them were writers and politically involved in everyday affairs. Pribićević was an officer in he Austro-Hungarian Army who defected to Serbia in 1904. Pribićević died in 1937.

References

1876 births
1937 deaths
People from Hrvatska Kostajnica
Serbs of Croatia
Yugoslav activists
Yugoslavism
Serbian military personnel of the Balkan Wars
Serbian military personnel of World War I
Burials at Belgrade New Cemetery